Alonso de Córdoba Gómez (1505–1589) was a Spanish nobleman's (rico-hombre's) son who sought his fortune in the New World.  He was born in Valdepeñas, Ciudad Real Province, Spain, and married Olalla of Merlo, also of Valdepeñas.

De Córdoba arrived with his wife in Peru in 1534, and Chile in 1540 along with Pedro de Valdivia. He was made an encomendero (trustee) over the indigenous population in Santiago, Chile and served as regidor of the city in 1548, 1568 and 1580.  He was mayor (alcalde) of Santiago in 1559, 1562, and 1581. He purchased the rights and founded the Spanish settlement at El Quisco.  He died in 1589 in Santiago.

An avenue in Vitacura is named after him.

References
 Amunátegui y Solar, Domingo (1909) Las encomiendas de indíjenas en Chile; memoria histórica presentada a la Universidad de Chile, en cumplimiento del artículo 22 de la lei de 9 de enero de 1879 Impr. Cervantes, Santiago, Chile, OCLC 6743204, in Spanish
 Ojeda, Tomás Thayer (1939) Formación de la sociedad chilena y censo de la población de Chile en los años de 1540 a 1565 Prensas de la Universidad de Chile, Santiago, Chile, OCLC 3170487, in Spanish

1505 births
1589 deaths
16th-century Chilean people
Spanish explorers
Spanish city founders
Encomenderos
16th-century Spanish people